New Movietone Follies of 1930 is a 1930 American Pre-Code musical film released by Fox Film Corporation, directed by Benjamin Stoloff. The film stars El Brendel and Marjorie White who also costarred in Fox's Just Imagine in 1930.

The film is a follow-up to Fox Movietone Follies of 1929 and has sequences filmed in Multicolor. An archival 35mm print of the film is in the collection of the UCLA Film and Television Archive.

Cast
El Brendel as Alex Svenson
Marjorie White as Vera Fontaine
Frank Richardson as George Randall
Noel Francis as Gloria de Witt
William Collier, Jr. as Conrad Sterling
Miriam Seegar as Mary Mason
Paul Nicholson as Lee Hubert
Huntley Gordon as Marvin Kinsley
Yola d'Avril as Maid
Betty Grable as Chorine (uncredited)

See also
List of early color feature films

References

External links
 
 

1930 films
1930 musical films
1930s color films
American musical films
American black-and-white films
American sequel films
Fox Film films
Films directed by Benjamin Stoloff
1930s English-language films
1930s American films